The African Book Publishing Record is an academic journal covering new and forthcoming African publications, providing full bibliographic and acquisitions data. It covers works of all levels in the African languages, as well as English, French, and Portuguese, in three indices by subject, country, and author. In addition to its bibliographic coverage, it also includes a book review section, reviews of new journals, and a variety of news, reports, and articles about African book trade activities and developments. The journal was established by Hans M. Zell and is now published by Walter de Gruyter. The current editor-in-chief is Cécile Lomer.

External links 
 

African studies
Publications established in 1975
English-language journals
De Gruyter academic journals
Quarterly journals